Baltic Unity day or Day of Baltic Unity is a commemorative day celebrated on September 22 in Lithuania and Latvia, as well as Latvian and Lithuanian communities abroad. It was recognized as such in 2000 by both the Seimas of Lithuania and Saeima of Latvia commemorating the 1236 Battle of Saule, where the joint pagan Samogitian and Semigallian forces decisively defeated the Livonian Brothers of the Sword.

The day is marked with various events all over Latvia and Lithuania, with the main events taking place in one city on a rotating basis. The last of those cities have been Rokiškis (2015), Liepāja (2016), Palanga (2017), and Jelgava (2018). In 2017 a special "Balts' Award" was established to be awarded to individuals for the promotion of Latvian and Lithuanian languages, literature, and historic research. In 2018 Latvian Lithuanian professor and linguist  became the first recipient of the prize.

References

Unity days
Latvian culture
Lithuanian culture
September observances